Wetherby was a rural district in the West Riding of Yorkshire from 1894 to 1974. It was named after the town of Wetherby.

It was abolished in 1974 under the Local Government Act 1972, and split between two new districts.  The parishes of Bardsey cum Rigton, Boston Spa, Bramham cum Oglethorpe, Clifford, Collingham, East Keswick, Harewood, Scarcroft, Thorner, Thorp Arch, Walton, Wetherby and Wothersome went to the City of Leeds metropolitan borough in West Yorkshire, with the rest becoming part of the borough of Harrogate in North Yorkshire.

References 

 http://www.visionofbritain.org.uk/relationships.jsp?u_id=10136155
 Local Government Act 1972

Wetherby
History of West Yorkshire
History of North Yorkshire
Districts of England created by the Local Government Act 1894
Districts of England abolished by the Local Government Act 1972
Local government in Leeds
Politics of the Borough of Harrogate
Rural districts of the West Riding of Yorkshire